CCGS John G. Diefenbaker is the name for a Canadian Coast Guard icebreaker that had been expected to join the fleet by 2017 but has been significantly delayed. Her namesake, John G. Diefenbaker, was Canada's 13th prime minister. It was Diefenbaker's government that founded the Canadian Coast Guard in 1962.

The ship was initially to have been constructed by Seaspan as part of the National Shipbuilding Procurement Strategy. However, by 2020, both the timing and location of this build had become uncertain. In February 2020, the federal government initiated a request to all interested Canadian shipyards to outline their capacity to potentially construct John G. Diefenbaker with the objective of securing service entry by December 2029.

In May 2021, the government announced that two ships of a single class would now be constructed, one at Seaspan's Vancouver Shipyard in British Columbia and the other at the Davie yard in Quebec, "pending the successful completion of the ongoing selection process as the third strategic partner for large ships construction under the National Shipbuilding Strategy". As of the end of 2021, further progress on the conclusion of the umbrella agreement had not yet been reported.

The revised service entry date for the first vessel was projected as 2030. The budget for this expanded program was unknown. In late 2021, the Parliamentary Budget Officer estimated the cost for two ships at $7.25 billion.

Project history
On 27 February 2008, the Government of Canada announced plans for a "Polar Class Icebreaker Project" as part of Canada's National Shipbuilding Strategy. At the time, the vessel's commissioned name was announced by Prime Minister Stephen Harper during a visit to Inuvik, Northwest Territories on 28 August 2008. The project was initially had an estimated budget of C$720 million to replace the nation's largest icebreaker and the flagship of the Canadian Coast Guard, .

The Minister of Defence Peter MacKay stated that the icebreaker will be built in Canada. As of the award of the NSPS contracts, John G. Diefenbaker will be built by Seaspan in British Columbia. Former Minister of Fisheries and Oceans Loyola Hearn announced the icebreaker will be homeported in his riding of St. John's, Newfoundland and Labrador.  He also stated that the vessel will be larger than Louis S. St-Laurent which she will be replacing.

In October 2012, a 1:25 scale model of John G. Diefenbaker was being evaluated in at the National Research Council's Institute for Ocean Technology in St. John's. Additional testing was carried out at Aker Arctic's ice tank in Finland.

The Canadian Coast Guard announced on 28 April 2010 that it was then "at the preliminary stages of conceptual design for the polar icebreaker. A "Request for Proposals" to undertake detailed design work was to have been ready mid-2011 with vessel construction to begin in 2013. However, continuous scheduling delays on other projects at the Seaspan yard, as well as budgetary increases, resulted in the reallocation of the planned icebreaker to another yard in 2019.

In early February 2012, STX Canada Marine (now Vard Marine Inc) was awarded the contract to design the new icebreaker for the Canadian Coast Guard. Although the majority of the design work was conducted in Vancouver, British Columbia by STX Canada, the design team also included the Finnish engineering company Aker Arctic. The work was initially planned to be complete by the end of 2013.

In May 2013 the Vancouver Sun reported that the Harper government acknowledged that both John G. Diefenbaker and the Royal Canadian Navy's new Joint Support Ships faced a scheduling conflict. According to the Vancouver Sun, because both vessels were scheduled to be built in the same facility, the Harper government would have to choose which project had priority, and went first. The Canadian American Strategic Review argued that John G. Diefenbaker better served protecting Canadian sovereignty than the Joint Support Ships, and should therefore get built first. However, on 11 October 2013 the NSPS Secretariat announced that the Joint Support Ships would be built first, followed by John G. Diefenbaker. This delay, coupled with the later decision to re-open the issue of where the Diefenbaker was to be constructed, required the government to try to keep the old icebreaker Louis S. St-Laurent in service through the 2020s. Refits were planned for that ship to take place at the Davie Shipyard over three 5-month dry-docking periods in 2022, 2024 and 2027 respectively, with an alongside work period in 2023.

In November 2013, it was reported that the budget for John G. Diefenbaker was revised up to 1.3 billion Canadian dollars, almost twice the initial estimate. Melanie Carkner of the Canadian Coast Guard stated that part of the price increase was to cover future requirements for the ship.

In November 2016, the Government of Canada announced a solicitation/request for proposals for the leasing of interim icebreakers under a fast track procurement process to fill the gap until and after John G. Diefenbaker reaches full operational capability.

Originally the ship was allocated to be built by Seaspan at their Vancouver Shipyard facility, in British Columbia after the company completed work on the Joint Support Ship project. However, the latter project was significantly delayed and in 2019 the Government of Canada announced a decision to remove the Polar Icebreaker from Seaspan’s portfolio of work and an announcement to build up to sixteen Multi Purpose Vessels. Following a Government review, in 2021, that decision was reversed and the Government announced that two Polar Icebreaker's would be built, one at Seaspan and one at a third NSS Shipyard, yet to be named. The second ship is planned to be built at the Davie Yard in Quebec, pending the successful conclusion of an umbrella agreement between the Government of Canada and Davie.

Michael Byers, the Canada Research chair in global politics and international law at the University of British Columbia, stated that "this icebreaker and new money for mapping is something that Arctic experts like myself have been calling for, for some years now. I hope it's real. I hope it's not just an election promise. We need it and we need it right now. But I'm still somewhat skeptical. This has been done before for cynical electoral politics."

Design

General characteristics 
Drawing  of water, the icebreaker has a displacement of 23,500 tonnes. She is projected to have a core crew of 60 and accommodation for additional 40 project personnel. Her facilities include laboratories and modular mission spaces, a moon pool, general purpose cargo hold and garage, multiple cranes and a helideck and hangar for two medium-lift helicopters. In addition, she is capable of receiving and refueling larger helicopters.

If built, this class of ship will eventually have a complement of 100 per vessel. They are estimated to be capable of carrying fuel and supplies to be self-sufficient for 270 days and be capable of making constant progress through  of ice.

John G. Diefenbaker will be classified by Lloyd's Register of Shipping. Her ice class is Polar Class 2, the second highest ice class according to the International Association of Classification Societies (IACS) Unified Requirements for Polar Class Ships. Furthermore, the class notation Icebreaker(+) will result in additional structural strengthening based on analysis of the vessel's operational profile potential ice loading scenarios. John G. Diefenbaker is one of the first vessels to hold this class notation.

Power and propulsion 

The power plant, divided into two separate engine rooms, provides power for all shipboard consumers from propulsion motors to lighting in the accommodation spaces.

Initially, two propulsion alternatives were proposed during the preliminary design: a traditional three-shaft configuration with a centerline rudder and a hybrid propulsion system consisting of two wing shafts and an azimuth thruster in the middle for improved maneuverability. Of these, the Canadian Coast Guard selected the latter with two  wing shafts and a  azimuth thruster. This makes John G. Diefenbaker the most powerful diesel-electric icebreaker in the world and the third most powerful non-nuclear icebreaker after the two gas turbine-powered Polar-class icebreakers operated by the United States Coast Guard. The icebreaker is also fitted with an air bubbling system that provides hull lubrication and reduces ice friction during icebreaking operations.

Performance 

In terms of icebreaking capability, this ranks her just below the largest Russian nuclear-powered icebreakers. The logistical endurance of the vessel will be 270 days.

References

External links

Icebreakers of the Canadian Coast Guard
Proposed ships
John Diefenbaker